Kuei Shan Senior High School is a high school in Taiwan.

References

External links
Official site

High schools in Taiwan